Palea Setu Tuilaepa is the coach of the Samoan Under-20s rugby union team and a Samoan former professional rugby league footballer who represented Western Samoa at the 1995 World Cup.

Playing career
Tuilaepa first made his debut for Western Samoa at the 1993 World Sevens. He was named in the squad for the 1995 World Cup but did not play a game.

He is a current coach of the Samoan Under-20s rugby union team.

References

Living people
Samoa national rugby league team players
1969 births
Samoan rugby union coaches
Samoan rugby league players